Thomas Louis Magliozzi (June 28, 1937 – November 3, 2014) and his brother Raymond Francis Magliozzi (born March 30, 1949) were the co-hosts of NPR's weekly radio show Car Talk, where they were known as "Click and Clack, the Tappet Brothers". Their show was honored with a Peabody Award in 1992, and the Magliozzis were both inducted into the National Radio Hall of Fame in 2014 and the Automotive Hall of Fame in 2018.

Tom died on November 3, 2014, aged 77, in Belmont, Massachusetts, of complications from Alzheimer's disease.

Early life and education

Tom Magliozzi was born in East Cambridge, Massachusetts. His education was entirely in Cambridge: Gannett School, Wellington School, Cambridge Rindge and Latin School, and the Massachusetts Institute of Technology, where he graduated. While at MIT, he participated in Air Force ROTC, and subsequently spent six months in the Army Reserve.

Ray Magliozzi was born in Cambridge, Massachusetts twelve years after his brother Tom. Ray also graduated from MIT.

Career

Tom earned a degree from the MIT Sloan School of Management. He worked for Sylvania's Semiconductor Division in Woburn, Massachusetts and then for the Foxboro Company while earning his MBA from Northeastern University and teaching part-time at local universities. He grew tired of his job and quit, spending the next year doing odd jobs such as painting for other tenants in his apartment building.

Ray taught science in Bennington, Vermont, for a few years before returning to Cambridge in 1973. He and Tom then opened a do-it-yourself repair shop named Hacker's Haven. The shop rented space and equipment to people who were trying to fix their own cars, but it was not profitable. Nevertheless, the two enjoyed the experience and were invited in 1977 to be part of a panel of automotive experts on Boston's National Public Radio affiliate WBUR-FM. Subsequently, the brothers converted the shop into a standard auto-repair shop named the Good News Garage.

In addition to the local radio show, Tom worked a day or two each week at the Technology Consulting Group run by a former MIT classmate in Boston, and he still taught at local universities. Tom believed college professors did not make much money without working other jobs, and that drove him to spend nine years working while getting his doctorate in Marketing from Boston University School of Management. After being a professor for eight years, he decided he disliked teaching and quit.

Car Talk

In January 1987, Susan Stamberg of Weekend Edition on NPR asked the two brothers to contribute weekly to her program. Nine months later, Car Talk premiered as an independent NPR program. In 1992, Tom and Ray won a Peabody Award for Car Talk for "distinguished achievement and meritorious public service". Tom and Ray continued to work in their repair garage while they produced Car Talk. On June 8, 2012, it was announced that Car Talk would stop producing new episodes in September 2012, though NPR would continue airing reruns of the show.

Producer Doug Berman said that Tom and Ray "changed public broadcasting forever" because the brothers "showed that real people are far more interesting than canned radio announcers." "The guys are culturally right up there with Mark Twain and the Marx Brothers."

Other work

In addition to the radio show, Tom wrote for CarTalk.com and ran his own consulting business. In 1999, the brothers returned to MIT to deliver a joint commencement speech to the graduates.

In 1989, the brothers started a newspaper column Click and Clack Talk Cars which, like the radio show, mixed serious advice with humor. King Features distributes the column. Ray continued to write the column, retitled Car Talk, after his brother's death in 2014, knowing he would have wanted the advice and humor to continue.

Tom and Ray both appeared in the Pixar films Cars (2006) and Cars 3 (2017). (Tom's role in the third film was accomplished through archival recordings, as it was produced after his death, while Ray reprised his role despite his retirement in 2012.) They played the owners of Rust-eze who discovered Lightning McQueen and gave him his first big break. Tom appeared as a 1963 Dodge Dart convertible, a reference to a car that he owned for many years and often mentioned on Car Talk. Ray appeared as a 1964 Dodge A100 van. In both films, they admonished: "Don't drive like my brother", the catchphrase from the close of their radio show.

The Magliozzi brothers also appeared in the sitcom Sabrina the Teenage Witch in an episode called "Driving Mr. Goodman" which aired on May 3, 2002. Sabrina calls them on a magical car radio for car advice. In the same year they appeared in the PBS Kids show Arthur episode called "Pick a Car, Any Car" which aired on November 25, 2002. Arthur calls them with a question about the family car, which would have been hauled away by the local mechanic without their help. The answer turns out to be a baby rattle lodged in the car's tailpipe. In 2008, the brothers starred in their own PBS animated series Click and Clack's As the Wrench Turns, playing fictionalized versions of themselves. They also hosted an episode of the PBS show NOVA entitled "The Car of the Future". Ray did radio and TV ads for eBay Motors in 2022 and voiced the Father of the Bride in the animated short film The Ten Commandments of Banquet Serving in 2023.

Filmography

Tom roles

Ray roles

References

Citations

General references

External links

 www.cartalk.com—Car Talk official site
 Tom's Car Talk bio
 Ray's Car Talk bio
 NPR bio
 
 

American people of Italian descent
Radio personalities from Boston
American talk radio hosts
American male voice actors
Magliozzi, Tom
Massachusetts Institute of Technology alumni
Magliozzi, Tom
Magliozzi, Tom
NPR personalities
People from Cambridge, Massachusetts
Sibling duos
Magliozzi, Tom
Cambridge Rindge and Latin School alumni